Dennis Boyd (born May 21, 1954) is a retired American basketball player.

Amateur career
Out of New York City and public high school Theodore Roosevelt in the Bronx where he averaged 27 ppg as a senior, Boyd signed to play college basketball for the University of Detroit with new Head Coach Dick Vitale beginning with the 1973–74 academic year.

Boyd established himself quickly with a Detroit program that would produce a .722 winning percentage during his time with the Titans (1973-1977).  Vitale added future NBA players such as John Long, Terry Tyler and Terry Duerod and built a dominating independent program at the Jesuit university.  Boyd played point guard for the team, averaged 10.3 ppg and 7.6 apg as a senior, and was noted for game-winning shots, including wins in his 1967-77 senior season over then #8 Arizona and a historic road win as the #15 Titans defeated #1 and eventual national champions Marquette with Boyd hitting a game-winning jumper with 4 seconds to go to secure the 64–63 win.  UD advanced to the 1977 NCAA Division I Basketball Tournament Sweet Sixteen, defeating Middle Tennessee in the first round before losing to Michigan 86–81 to end a stellar season.

Professional career
Boyd was selected by the New Orleans Jazz in the 4th round (72nd pick overall) of the 1977 NBA Draft but was cut in the preseason.  Vitale took the head coaching position for the Detroit Pistons of the NBA in 1978 and signed Boyd as a free agent for an 8-day stretch in 1978, with Boyd averaging 5.4 ppg in 5 games of NBA action, playing alongside former UD teammates Long and Tyler.  He was released by the Pistons on December 28, 1978, bringing his brief professional career to a close.

References

External links

1954 births
Living people
African-American basketball players
American men's basketball players
Basketball players from Virginia
Detroit Pistons players
Detroit Mercy Titans men's basketball players
Guards (basketball)
New Orleans Jazz draft picks
Sportspeople from Portsmouth, Virginia
21st-century African-American people
20th-century African-American sportspeople